Modulus is a genus of small sea snails, marine gastropod molluscs in the family Modulidae.

Species
Species within the genus Modulus include:
 Modulus ambiguus Dautzenberg, 1910
 Modulus bayeri Petuch, 2001
 Modulus bermontianus Petuch, 1994
 Modulus cerodes A. Adams, 1851
 Modulus disculus (Philippi, 1846)
 Modulus guernei Dautzenberg, 1900
 Modulus hennequini Petuch, 2013
 Modulus honkerorum Petuch, 2013
 Modulus kaicherae Petuch, 1987
 Modulus lindae Petuch, 1987
 Modulus modulus (Linnaeus, 1758) - the type species, known as the "button snail"
 Modulus nodosus Macsotay & Campos, 2001
 Modulus pacei Petuch, 1987
 Modulus turbinoides (Locard, 1897)
Taxa inquirenda
 Modulus duplicatus A. Adams, 1851
 Modulus morleti P. Fischer, 1882 
 Modulus obliquus A. Adams, 1851 
 Modulus obtusatus (Philippi, 1847) 
Species brought into synonymy
 Modulus calusa Petuch, 1988: synonym of Trochomodulus calusa (Petuch, 1988) (original combination)
 Modulus canaliculatus Mörch, 1876: synonym of Modulus modulus (Linnaeus, 1758)
 Modulus candidus Petit de la Saussaye, 1853: synonym of [[Indomodulus tectum]] (Gmelin, 1791)
 Modulus carchedonius (Lamarck, 1822): synonym of Trochomodulus carchedonius (Lamarck, 1822)
 Modulus catenulatus (Philippi, 1849): synonym of Trochomodulus catenulatus (Philippi, 1849)
 Modulus cidaris Reeve, 1848: synonym of Modulus tectum (Gmelin, 1791): synonym of Indomodulus tectum (Gmelin, 1791)
 Modulus convexior Mörch, 1876: synonym of Modulus modulus (Linnaeus, 1758)
 Modulus dorsuosus Gould, 1853: synonym of Modulus disculus (Philippi, 1846)
 Modulus floridanus Conrad, 1869: synonym of Modulus modulus (Linnaeus, 1758)
 Modulus krebsii Mörch, 1876: synonym of Modulus modulus (Linnaeus, 1758)
 Modulus lenticularis (Lamarck, 1822): synonym of Modulus modulus (Linnaeus, 1758)
 Modulus perlatus (Gmelin, 1791): synonym of Modulus modulus (Linnaeus, 1758)
 Modulus pisum Mörch, 1876: synonym of Modulus modulus (Linnaeus, 1758)
 Modulus tectum (Gmelin, 1791): synonym of Indomodulus tectum (Gmelin, 1791)
 Modulus trochiformis Souleyet, 1852: synonym of Trochomodulus catenulatus (Philippi, 1849)

References 

 Landau B., Vermeij G. K. & Reich S. (2014). Classification of the Modulidae (Caenogastropoda, Cerithioidea), with new genera and new fossil species from the Neogene of tropical America and Indonesia. Basteria. 78(1-3): 1-29

External links

 Gray, J. E. (1842). Molluscs. Pp. 48-92, in: Synopsis of the contents of the British Museum, edition 44. British Museum. London. iv + 308 p
 Rafinesque C.S. (1819). Prodrome. De 70 nouveaux genres d'animaux découverts dans l'intérieur des Etats-Unis d'Amérique, durant l'année 1818. Journal de Physique, de Chimie, d'Histoire Naturelle et des Arts. 88: 417-429.

Modulidae
Taxa named by John Edward Gray